David Briones (born February 26, 1943) is a senior United States district judge of the United States District Court for the Western District of Texas.

Education and career
Born in El Paso, Texas, Briones was in the United States Army from 1964 to 1966, then received a Bachelor of Arts degree from the University of Texas at El Paso in 1969 and a Juris Doctor from the University of Texas School of Law in 1971. He was in private practice in El Paso from 1971 to 1991. He was a judge on the El Paso County Court at Law Number One from 1991 to 1994.

Federal judicial service
On August 25, 1994, Briones was nominated by President Bill Clinton to a seat on the United States District Court for the Western District of Texas vacated by Lucius Desha Bunton. Briones was confirmed by the United States Senate on October 7, 1994, and received his commission on October 11, 1994. He assumed senior status on February 26, 2009. He was succeeded by Judge David Campos Guaderrama

On December 10, 2019, Briones blocked President Donald Trump from using federal military funds for the border wall. On January 8, 2020, the United States Court of Appeals for the Fifth Circuit stayed Briones' nationwide injunction, pending disposition of the appeal.

See also
List of Hispanic/Latino American jurists
National Emergency Concerning the Southern Border of the United States

Notes

References
  

1943 births
Living people
University of Texas School of Law alumni
Hispanic and Latino American judges
Judges of the United States District Court for the Western District of Texas
United States district court judges appointed by Bill Clinton
United States Army soldiers
People from El Paso, Texas
20th-century American judges
21st-century American judges